The Towers of Toron is a 1964 science fantasy novel by Samuel R. Delany, and is the second novel in the "Fall of the Towers" trilogy. The novel was originally published as Ace Double F-261, together with The Lunar Eye by Robert Moore Williams.

The stories of the Fall of the Towers trilogy were originally set in the same post-holocaust Earth as Delany's earlier The Jewels of Aptor; however, linking references were removed in later revised editions.

References

Sources

External links
 

Novels by Samuel Delany
1964 American novels
1964 fantasy novels
1964 science fiction novels
American science fiction novels
Books with cover art by Ed Emshwiller